Arua Regional Referral Hospital, commonly known as Arua Hospital is a hospital in the town of Arua, in Northern Uganda. It is the referral hospital for the districts of Adjumani, Arua, Koboko, Maracha, Moyo, Nebbi, Yumbe, and Zombo. The hospital also receives referrals from neighboring parts of South Sudan and the Democratic Republic of the Congo.

Location
Arua Regional Referral Hospital is located in the city of Arua, Arua District, West Nile sub-region, in the Northern Region of Uganda. The coordinates of Arua Regional Referral Hospital are: 03°01'10.0"N, 30°54'45.0"E (Latitude:3.019444; Longitude:30.912500).

Overview
Arua Hospital is a public hospital, funded by the Uganda Ministry of Health and general care in the hospital is free. It is one of the thirteen (13) Regional Referral Hospitals in Uganda. The hospital is designated as one of the fifteen (15) Internship Hospitals in Uganda where graduates of Ugandan medical schools can serve one year of internship under the supervision of qualified specialists and consultants. The bed capacity of Arua Hospital is quoted as 272, although the hospital admits far more patients, with the excess either sleeping on the floor, or sharing beds.

See also
Hospitals in Uganda

References

External links
  Arua District Internet Portal

Arua Hospital
Arua District
Arua
West Nile sub-region
Northern Region, Uganda